Río Amazonas Airport  is an airport serving Shell Mera, a town in the Pastaza Province of Ecuador. The airport was established in 1937 by Royal Dutch Shell and abandoned in 1948. In 1949 the Mission Aviation Fellowship, a Christian missionary group, established themselves in the area and used the airport as their main base.

Accidents and incidents
In March 2016, a military plane taking off from Amazonas Airport crashed in Pastaza province, killing all 22 soldiers aboard.

See also

Transport in Ecuador
List of airports in Ecuador

References

External links
OurAirports - Río Amazonas
SkyVector - Río Amazonas

Airports in Ecuador
Buildings and structures in Pastaza Province